Donald Denver Fleming (June 11, 1937 – June 4, 1963) was an American college and professional football player who was a safety in the National Football League (NFL) for three seasons during the early 1960s.  Fleming played college football for the University of Florida, and thereafter, he played professionally for the Cleveland Browns of the NFL.  His professional football career was cut short by his accidental death by electrocution in 1963.

Early life 

Fleming was born in Bellaire, Ohio, in 1937 to Denver Fleming. He attended Shadyside High School in Shadyside, Ohio, where he was a standout prep player for the Shadyside Tigers high school football team.

College career 

Fleming attended the University of Florida in Gainesville, Florida, where he played for coach Bob Woodruff's Florida Gators football team from 1956 to 1958.  Fleming was the Gators' team captain in 1958, and he finished his college football career as a first-team All-Southeastern Conference (SEC) selection.  Woodruff ranked him as the Gators' best receiver of the 1950s.

The Chicago Cardinals drafted Fleming following his senior football season, but he chose to remain in school and exhaust his remaining NCAA baseball eligibility playing for coach Dave Fuller's Florida Gators baseball team from 1958 to 1960.  He was the captain of the Gators baseball team, and led the Gators in home runs and stolen bases.

Professional career 

Fleming was selected by the Chicago Cardinals in the 28th round (327th pick overall) of the 1959 NFL Draft, but he remained at the University of Florida and did not play during the  NFL season. He successfully urged Chicago management to trade him to the Cleveland Browns before the start of the  season. Fleming was a close friend of another Browns defensive back, Bernie Parrish, a fellow Florida graduate, and the two were said to be almost inseparable during the NFL season.

Accidental death and legacy 

Fleming, his wife Rosalie and their son Ty lived in his hometown of Shadyside, Ohio, during football season, and in Winter Park, Florida, during the NFL off-season.  As a 25-year-old NFL All-Conference selection, Fleming was already planning for when his professional football career ended.  He had majored in building construction at the University of Florida, and had been working as a foreman for a Central Florida construction company during the off-season to stay in shape and gain industry experience.  On June 4, 1963, Fleming and a co-worker, Walter Smith, were operating a crane on a construction site west of Orlando, Florida, when the boom of the crane brushed an overhead 12,000-volt high-tension electrical transmission line.  Fleming and Smith were electrocuted, and attempts to revive them at the hospital failed.

Earlier the same day, the Browns had announced that Fleming had signed his contract for the 1963 season.  His death came only 17 days after that of Ernie Davis, the overall No. 1 pick in the 1962 NFL Draft, whom the Browns had acquired in a trade.  The Browns retired both Davis' uniform number No. 45 and Fleming's No. 46 in memory of the players.  Fleming Field at Shadyside High School, Fleming's alma mater, is named in his memory.  When the Browns practiced at Western Reserve Eclectic Institute (Hiram College), the field house they used also carried Fleming's name.

Fleming was nominated for the Florida Sports Hall of Fame within days of his death, and he was later inducted into the University of Florida Athletic Hall of Fame as a "Gator Great."

See also
 History of the Cleveland Browns
 List of Florida Gators in the NFL Draft
 List of University of Florida alumni
 List of University of Florida Athletic Hall of Fame members

References

Bibliography 

 Carlson, Norm, University of Florida Football Vault: The History of the Florida Gators, Whitman Publishing, LLC, Atlanta, Georgia (2007).  .
 Carroll, Bob, et al., Total Football II, HarperCollins, New York, New York (1999).  .
 Golenbock, Peter, Go Gators!  An Oral History of Florida's Pursuit of Gridiron Glory, Legends Publishing, LLC, St. Petersburg, Florida (2002).  .
 Hairston, Jack, Tales from the Gator Swamp: A Collection of the Greatest Gator Stories Ever Told, Sports Publishing, LLC, Champaign, Illinois (2002).  .
 McCarthy, Kevin M.,  Fightin' Gators: A History of University of Florida Football, Arcadia Publishing, Mount Pleasant, South Carolina (2000).  .
 McEwen, Tom, The Gators: A Story of Florida Football, The Strode Publishers, Huntsville, Alabama (1974).  .

1937 births
1963 deaths
Accidental deaths by electrocution
Accidental deaths in Florida
American builders
American football safeties
Chicago Cardinals players
Cleveland Browns players
Florida Gators baseball players
Florida Gators football players
Industrial accident deaths
People from Bellaire, Ohio
National Football League players with retired numbers